The Cranberry River is a river in central Massachusetts that is part of the Chicopee River Watershed.

See also 
List of rivers of Massachusetts

References 

 Environmental Protection Agency

Rivers of Worcester County, Massachusetts
Tributaries of the Connecticut River
Rivers of Massachusetts